Boneh-ye Fakhr may refer to:
 Boneh-ye Fakhr-e Bala
 Boneh-ye Fakhr-e Pain